James Ballantine (11 June 1806 – 18 December 1877) was a Scottish artist and author.

His son, Alexander (1841–1906), later joined his stained-glass window business.

Life 
Born West Port, Edinburgh. His father was a brewer who died when he was 10. He received little education and what he did know came from his mother or being self-taught. In his early teens he was apprenticed to a house painter in Edinburgh. Aged 20 he went to the University of Edinburgh. After graduating he turned his attention to the art of painting on glass. He quickly achieved high eminence in his field, with his business Ballantine and Allan, and got the contract for painting the windows of the House of Lords through a public competition. His 1845 book ‘A treatise of Stained Glass’ became a standard work. He started writing poetry at a young age and through the popular ‘Gaberlunzie’s wallet’ became an established writer. He wrote poetry books and also a collection of his songs. He died from a "congestion of the lungs" in Warrender Lodge, Meadows, Edinburgh.

Works

Fiction 

 The Gaberlunzie's Wallet. 1842.Edinburgh : J. Menzies. 348pp 
 The Miller of Deanhaugh . 1844. Edinburgh : J. Menzies. 312pp. 
 Poems. 1856. Edinburgh : T. Constable. viii+312pp. 
 The Gaberlunzie: a Scotch drama adapted from the novel of The Gaberlunzies Wallet. 1858. Edinburgh : J. Menzies. iv+(5-43)pp. 
 Verses for the Burns' centenary banquet, on the 25th January, 1859, in the Music Hall, Edinburgh. 1859. Edinburgh. 8pp. 
 Chronicle of the Hundredth Birthday of Robert Burns. Collected and edited by J. Ballantine [With a genealogical table]. 1859. Edinburgh & London. Fullarton & Co. vi+605pp. 
 One Hundred Songs .. With melodies original & selected. 1866. J. S. Marr: Glasgow. v+209pp. 
 Lilias Lee and other poems. 1871. William Blackwood and Sons. vi+276pp.

Stained glass
House of Lords, London
Main hall at Dunoon Burgh Hall
St John's Kirk, Perth

Miscellaneous works 

 A Treatise on Painted Glass, shewing its applicability to every style of architecture. 1845. Chapman & Hall: London; John Menzies: Edinburgh. 51pp+8Plates.
 The Life of David Roberts, R.A. Compiled from his journals and other sources .. With etchings and facsimiles of pen-and-ink sketches by the artist. 1866. Edinburgh : Adam and Charles Black. xiv+255pp+ 9 etched plates+26 facsimiles of rough pen-and-ink sketches of pictures from Mr. Roberts' journal, portrait of Roberts and drawing of his birthplace. 
 A Visit to Buxton. 1873. J. C. Bates: Buxton. 22pp. 
 Sir James Falshaw, Bart .. Lord Provost of the City of Edinburgh, 1874-1877. 1910 Otto Schulze & Co.: Edinburgh. 25pp.

Contributions 

 Essay on Ornamental Art as applicable to trade and manufactures. In. Leith (Samuel) The Tradesman's Book of Ornamental Designs. 1847.
 Lays and Lyrics of Scotland, arranged with new Symphonies and Accompaniments for the Pianoforte by J. Fulcher. With a historical epitome of  Scottish Song by J. Ballantine and an appendix of notes historical, biographical, and critical compiled by the publishers 1870. Glasgow. Swan & Pentland. xi+344pp.

References 

 Murdoch, Alexander G. Recent and Living Scottish Poets. 1883 Pages 154-156.
 Edwards, D.H. Modern Scottish Poets. Series 3 1881 Pages 25–32.
 

Writers from Edinburgh
19th-century Scottish painters
Scottish male painters
19th-century Scottish writers
1806 births
1877 deaths
Alumni of the University of Edinburgh
19th-century Scottish male artists